Little Dixie may refer to:

Regions
Little Dixie (Missouri)
Little Dixie (Oklahoma)

Communities
Little Dixie, Arkansas, an unincorporated community in Arkansas on the Woodruff-Prairie county line
Little Dixie, Kentucky, also known as Dixiefield, in Henderson County, Kentucky